Lindsay Maxsted is an Australian businessman. He served as the chairman of the board of Westpac.

Biography
Maxsted was born and raised in Geelong, Victoria.

From July 1984 to February 2008, he was a partner of KPMG Australia and, from January 2001 to December 2007, was its CEO.

He joined the board of directors of Westpac in 2008 and has been its chairman since 2011. He has also served on the boards of directors of the Transurban Group and BHP.

He served on the board of the Victorian Public Transport Corporation from December 1995 to 1997, and was its chairman until 2001. He serves on the board of trustees of Baker Heart and Diabetes Institute.

In 2008, Maxsted joined the Westpac board and in 2011 he became chairman.

In November 2019, Maxsted announced that he was stepping down as Westpac's chairman.

In January 2020, Maxsted announced that he wouldn't seek re-election for director of BHP.

References

Living people
Year of birth missing (living people)

Westpac people
BHP people